01 January is a 2009 Maldivian psychological thriller short film written and directed by Yoosuf Shafeeu. Co-produced by Shafeeu and Ahmed Wafau under Eupe Productions in association with Kids Productions, the film stars Shafeeu, Mohamed Farooq, Mohamed Rifshan and Yoosuf Zuhuree in pivotal roles.

Premise
Two promising surfers (Mohamed Farooq and Mohamed Rifshan) visits an island and stays at a guest room for three days, rented by a short-tempered and peculiar man (Yoosuf Shafeeu). He sets strange rules to be followed by tenants; return home before 11pm, never leave the door open and by no circumstances ever follow him to anywhere. The next day they made a plan to steal a large sum of money in a locked room of the house which Rifshan saw in a dream and interprets it as real since the facts coincides with what their friend who lives in the island says.

Cast 
 Yoosuf Shafeeu
 Hamdhan Farooq
 Mohamed Rifshan
 Yoosuf Zuhuree
 Ali Firaq

Soundtrack

References

Maldivian short films
2009 short films
2009 films
Films directed by Yoosuf Shafeeu